The Blackfriars shipwrecks were a series of wrecks discovered by archaeologist Peter Marsden in the Blackfriars area of the banks of the River Thames in London, England. The wrecks were discovered while building a riverside embankment wall along the River Thames. Marsden discovered the first on 6 September 1962 and the next two were discovered in 1970. A later discovery added to the previous three wrecks, constituting now what is known as the four Blackfriars wrecks.

Blackfriars I 

Discovered by Peter Marsden on 6 September 1962, the first Blackfriars ship became the earliest known indigenous seagoing sailing ship to be found in northern Europe, dating back to the 2nd century AD. The wreck is dated to a period of great Roman expansion and construction. Found between Blackfriars Bridge and Blackfriars Railway Bridge during the construction of a new riverside wall, the Blackfriars I has been variously interpreted as a native Brythonic shipbuilding style or a traditional Roman style.

The ship was quite flat-bottomed; there was no keel, but "two thick flat keel-planks which lay side by side with a central seam between them". The ship had had a Teredo worm infestation, so it was probably seagoing at some point.

The Blackfriars I was built frame-first, meaning that the frame of the ship was built before building the rest of the ship. This method was much faster and saved wood, and was advanced for the period. Marsden described the ship as having a carvel-built hull, caulked with hazel shavings and pine resin; the hull planks were secured with clench-nails. On the ship, a bronze votive coin of the Emperor Domitian was found in the mast-step. The cargo has shifted to the port side, and the ship had sunk with a list (lean) to port, probably after it was heeled (leaned over) by a collision. With further findings about the area of operation of the ship, Marsden suggested Blackfriars I was used for construction purposes. The rest of the cargo included: two pottery sherds, a wooden mallet, and a piece of leather. Marsden was able to conclude, using the location and position of the wreck that it crashed into another vessel, a collision which was responsible for the ship sinking.

Blackfriars II
The Blackfriars II was discovered in June 1969 east of Blackfriars Bridge. The ship was carrying a cargo of brick when it was wrecked. Marsden and R. Inman excavated the wreck. Their findings showed that the cargo included new red bricks, pipes and pottery that dated back to 1660–80. With this information, Marsden was able to conclude that the ship was carrying materials meant for rebuilding London after the Great Fire of 1666. The techniques used to build this ship led Marsden to believe that the state of contemporary knowledge of shipbuilding was insufficient for dating small boats.

Blackfriars III and IV
The Blackfriars III and IV were discovered in 1970 in the riverfront extremely close to the sites of the previous two discoveries. The ships date back to 15th century. The wreck is believed to be the result of a deadly collision between the two vessels. The Blackfriars IV is believed to have collided with the Blackfriars III and sunk it. The wreck contained no cargo, but archaeologists, while excavating around the site, found two pewter badges, the bronze arm of a pair of shears, two larger lead weights, and an iron grapnel. As with the other Blackfriars ships, these two appear to have been used to carry and transport building supplies.

The Blackfriars III ship is the most complete medieval sailing ship to be discovered in Britain. Marsden believed the ship to resemble a river vessel known as a "shout".

The Blackfriars IV was a clinker-built vessel, built around the 15th century. It was possible that it was a local river craft that was used to unload larger vessels.

See also
Blackfriars, London
Blackfriars Bridge
Classis Britannica

References 

Milne, G. 1996. "Blackfriars ship 1; Romano-Celtic, Gallo-Roman or Classis Britannicae?" The International Journal of Nautical Archaeology 25: 234–238.
Marsden, P. 1972. "Blackfriars Wreck III: A Preliminary Note." The International Journal of Nautical Archaeology 1: 130–132.
1998. "Blackfriars Wrecks." In Encyclopedia of underwater and maritime archaeology, edited by J. Delgado, 64–66. New Haven: Yale University Press.

Shipwrecks of the River Thames
Port of London